Koh-Lanta: Caramoan was the eighth season of the French version of Survivor. This season took place on the Caramoan Peninsula, and was broadcast on TF1 from July 4, 2008 to September 20, 2008 airing on Fridays at 6:55 p.m. The two original tribes this season were Mingao and Tayak. Because Valérie and Céga left the game early, Irya came back into the game, and Alain joined later on.

The winner of this season of Koh-lanta was Christelle who won the prize of €100,000.

Contestants

Future appearances
Jean-Bernard Hauton-Arnaud and Christelle Gauzet late returned for Koh-Lanta: Le Retour des Héros. Christophe Guttatoro-Martin returned for Koh-Lanta: Le Choc des Héros. Bertrand Bolle returned for Koh-Lanta: La Revanche des Héros which Bolle won. Nathalie Ensargueix later returned for Koh-Lanta: Le Combat des Héros. Gauzet returned for a third time in Koh-Lanta: La Légende.

Voting History

08
2008 French television seasons
Television shows filmed in the Philippines